Maya Newell is an Australian filmmaker, known for the feature-length documentaries Gayby Baby (2015) and In My Blood It Runs (2019). She works at Closer Productions in Adelaide, South Australia.

Newell had intended to study international relations or medicine, but at the age of 17 won a scholarship to attend Sydney Film School for a year.

Newell made several documentary short films before her feature-length films. While still a student at the film school, she made a documentary called Richard (2007), about a passionate toymaker with whom she made friends while filming. After he killed himself during the making of the film, she wrestled with the ethics of completing the film, but decided ultimately that it was a way of helping to invoke empathy.

Gayby Baby observes the lives of four children whose parents are homosexual, examining the ways in which the sexual identity of their parents may have affected them. The impetus for the film was her own experience of growing up with two lesbian mothers, and she felt it was important to represent the child's perspective of being raised in such a family. During the making of the film, there was a public debate about marriage equality in Australia (which ultimately led to a successful plebiscite on the matter). The film was later shown on free-to-air national broadcaster SBS TV as well as Foxtel.

Newell and co-producer Charlotte Mars  founded their own production company during the making of Gaybe Baby, called Marla House, self-described as "a production house that revels in telling stories that are transporting, nuanced and a little bit subversive".

In My Blood It Runs, directed by Newell and produced by her, Sophie Hyde, Rachel Nanninaaq Edwardson, and Larissa Behrendt, was made in collaboration with Arrernte and Garrwa people in the Northern Territory. It had its world premiere at the Hot Docs Canadian International Documentary Festival in Toronto in April/May 2019. The film follows the story of 10-year-old Dujuan Hoosan, a healer and hunter, as his family tries to give him an Arrernte education alongside the western education system. Dujuan gets into trouble and was almost imprisoned once, and the film highlights the Age of criminal responsibility in Australia, which is  10 years old. As a twelve-year-old, the boy was the youngest person ever to make a speech to the UN Human Rights Council about youth incarceration.

In My Blood It Runs  premiered at Hot Docs Canadian International Documentary Festival, where it was nominated in the "Best International Documentary" category in 2019. Other award nominations included AACTA Awards, Durban International Film Festival Best Documentary, Film Critics Circle of Australia Awards, the Documentary Foundation Australia Award at the Sydney Film Festival and Best Documentary Feature at Warsaw International Film Festival. The film was screened on ABC TV on 5 July 5. In 2021, the film was made available for showing in schools in the UK.

In 2022, Newell debuted her long-awaited documentary short about transgender advocate Georgie Stone, titled The Dreamlife of Georgie Stone, at Tribeca Film Festival.

References

Further reading

External links

Australian film directors
Australian film producers
People from Sydney
Year of birth missing (living people)
Australian women film directors
Australian women film producers
Living people